Xavier Patier (5 March 1958, Brive-la-Gaillarde) is a high French Civil Service official and writer.

Biography 
Graduated from the Institut d'études politiques de Paris, Xavier Patier is also a former student of the École nationale d'administration (class "Solidarité"). Parallel to his administrative career, marked by several passages in the ministerial chambers, close to Jacques Chirac and Simone Veil, he devoted himself to the writing of his literary work, which earned him several prizes.

He is one of the grandsons of former minister Edmond Michelet.

Works 
1986: Frère Honorat, Éditions Gallimard
1988: Le Juge, Gallimard, Cino Del Duca prize
1988: Le Migrateur
1990: Point d'orgue, Gallimard
1992: Pour en finir avec le travail, essay, La Table ronde 
1994: Reste avec moi, Gallimard
1994: Bientôt nous ne serons plus rien, La Table ronde
1995: C'était pas si mal sous Giscard, theatre, La Table ronde
1997: Trois minutes de soleil en plus, short stories, La Table ronde
1996: Poison, La Table ronde
1999: La Foire aux célibataires, La Table ronde
2000: Horace à la campagne, Les Belles-Lettres
2000: Les Trentenaires, La Table ronde
2001: Le Démon de l'acédie, La Table ronde
2001: L'Acquitté, La Table ronde
2002: La Chasse, essay, Le Cavalier bleu,  prize
2002: Chasses à cœur ouvert, with Pierre Moinot, Léon Mazzella and 
2003: Laisser-courre, La Table ronde
2004: Le Château absolu, La Table ronde
2008: Le Silence des termites, La Table ronde, Prix Roger Nimier (2009)
2010: Un arbre en hiver, éditions Le Promeneur
2012: Chaux vive, La Table ronde
2014: Blaise Pascal, la nuit de l'extase , Éditions du Cerf, series "Épiphanie"

Honours 
 Chevalier of the Ordre national du Mérite
 Chevalier of the Légion d'honneur (2004)

Distinctions 
 Corresponding member of the Académie des beaux-arts (elected 21 octobre 2009, section des correspondants libres)

External links 
 Xavier Patier et la tentation de Port-Royal on Valeurs actuelles
 Le livre qui a changé ma vie: Xavier Patier on Famille chrétienne
 Xavier Patier, le charme discret de la modestie on La Dépêche.fr
 Toulouse : énarque et écrivain, Xavier Patier va diriger les services du Capitole on France 3
 Les conseils de Xavier Patier pour faire retraite au quotidien on La Vie.fr

Paris 2 Panthéon-Assas University alumni
Sciences Po alumni
École nationale d'administration alumni
20th-century French non-fiction writers
Roger Nimier Prize winners
Knights of the Ordre national du Mérite
Chevaliers of the Légion d'honneur
People from Brive-la-Gaillarde
1958 births
Living people